USS Reindeer is a name used more than once by the U.S. Navy:

 , a Civil War gunboat placed in service early in July 1863.
 , a coal-burning harbor tug that developed , built in 1920.
 , originally projected as ATR-116, commissioned 20 December 1944.

United States Navy ship names